Huanggang East railway station is a railway station in Huangzhou District, Huanggang, Hubei, China. It was built as a terminus station at the eastern end of the Wuhan–Huanggang intercity railway. With the completion of the Huanggang–Huangmei high-speed railway, it became an intermediate stop on the railway between Wuhan and Huangmei.

From 12 August 2022, a new service pattern was implemented that included regular services to Wuhan East railway station.

The station has two island platforms and four platform faces.

References 

Railway stations in Hubei